Navianos or Navianos de la Vega is a locality located in the municipality of Alija del Infantado, in León province, Castile and León, Spain. As of 2020, it has a population of 95.

Geography 
Navianos is located 68km south-southwest of León, Spain.

References

Populated places in the Province of León